Voices of Spring (German: Frühlingsstimmen) is a 1933 Austrian operetta film directed by Pál Fejös and starring Adele Kern, S. Z. Sakall and Oskar Karlweis. The film is named after Johann Strauss II's waltz "Frühlingsstimmen".

Cast
 Adele Kern as Hannerl Krüger
 S. Z. Sakall as Krüger, Teacher's Aide
 Oskar Karlweis as Franz Waldmüller
 Ursula Grabley as Olly Krüger
 Hans Thimig as Toni
 Frida Richard as Old Woman
 Theodor Danegger
 Teddy Bill
 Karl Ehmann
 Hermine Sterler
 
 Sonia Lefkova as Dancer
 Vienna State Opera Ballet
 Vienna State Opera Chorus

References

Bibliography 
 Robert Dassanowsky. World Film Locations: Vienna. Intellect Books, 2012.

External links 
 

1933 films
Austrian musical films
1933 musical films
1930s German-language films
Films directed by Paul Fejos
Operetta films
Films set in Vienna
Films shot in Vienna
Films scored by Oscar Straus
Austrian black-and-white films